SiteW is a French-based company that offers a website building service.

History
The idea for SiteW (pronounced Site Double-Vé) was born in the Spring of 2007 when Fabien Versange and Cédric Hamel, two computer scientists with a shared passion for web technologies, were approached by several local business in the Auvergne region, such as associations, small hotels, shopkeepers and artisans to design their websites. These people had a limited budget and were unable to call on specialized companies for these services, while also lacking the technical knowledge to create websites on their own. This common demand inspired the two to form a company around the central idea to make the design of a website faster, easier and more accessible to common individuals and professionals in an effort to try and make the internet more democratic with the help of SiteW's website creation tool.

Hailing from Cantal, in the central region of France, the company was registered at the Chamber of Commerce of Aurillac in January 2008, where they opened their offices in nearby Calvinet before relocating to Cassaniouze after three years, launching their website and online web services a Month later. Business picked up quickly with hundreds of users signing up within the first couple of Months and the first companies outside of France making use of the service by September of the same year. By December 2010 the company had successfully registered and created 150,000 websites. In 2011 the German version of the website was released. On 26 June 2012 another milestone was reached with 500,000 websites created and launched using the SiteW tools with 15% of the customer base coming from abroad. In September 2014 the company had managed to help create 1 million websites. That same year the company upgraded all their website building tools.

Functionality
The company offers a web based service, using the SaaS model, making the platform easy to access without having to download any applications. The tools are simplified and easy to understand, using a simple drag-and-drop methodology for creating a website. The websites that are created are then hosted on a secured server using cloud technology that can be accessed from around the World. The company offer three different packages which provide different solutions and amount of storage space, depending on the size and functionality necessary to facilitate the customer's needs. The most basic membership is free, with the highest available subscription costing €23,99/Month. Making use of HTML5 and CSS3 the website and its services are developed updated frequently to ensure proper integration and performance on all platforms.

Reception
As of 2016 the company have launched over 1,5 million websites for a global customer base spread across 216 countries. On average 600 new websites per day are launched by people using the SiteW services. In 2010 the company were awarded the golden laurels at the Concours Talents for Technological Innovation, making them 1 of 3 recipients from the Auvergne region that year.

Awards
 2010 Concours Talents
 Category: Technological innovation (Winners)
 2016 Pépites d’Auvergne
 For the region of Cantal (Winners)

References

External links

Wordpress Website Cost
WordPress Theme Template

Web hosting
Web development software
Online companies of France
Free web hosting services